The men's shot put at the 2013 Asian Athletics Championships was held at the Shree Shiv Chhatrapati Sports Complex on 3 July.

Results

References
Results

Shot
Shot put at the Asian Athletics Championships